The Finished People is a 2003 drama about three youths living on the streets of Cabramatta, New South Wales. The film follows the stories of the three main characters; Des, Van and Tommy. The film started out in June 2002 while Rodney, Joe, Jason and Shane were attending classes at a youth services organization called Open Family based in Cabramatta, New South Wales.

Cast
Rodney Anderson as Des
Joe Le as Van
Jason McGoldrick as Tommy
Daniela Italiano as Carla
Mylinh Dinh as Sara
Sarah Vongmany as Sophie
Shane Macdonald as Simon
Ivan Topic as Boss
Viet Dang as Geoff

Box office
The Finished People grossed $75,431 at the box office in Australia.

See also
Cinema of Australia

References

External links

2003 films
Australian docudrama films
2003 drama films
2000s English-language films
2000s Australian films